Michael Lister (born February 11, 1968) is an American novelist of Florida-based mysteries, suspense, thrillers, and noirs. He has authored 32 mystery novels, most featuring his two best-known characters, prison chaplain John Jordan (Blood-themed series) and 1940s noir detective Jimmy "Soldier" Riley (Big-themed series). He has a total of 36 books in print.  He won the Florida Book Award in 2009 for his literary novel, Double Exposure.

Early life
Lister was born in Tallahassee, Florida, and grew up in Wewahitchka, Florida. Wewahitchka, or "Wewa", as the locals call it, is a small town well known for its tupelo honey, Dead Lakes, and Apalachicola River.
The Florida Panhandle has a long oral history, and story-telling was an important part of Lister's life.  Stories of the South, with its rich milieu of rivers, swamps, trains, red dirt roads, and Spanish moss-lined oak trees, inspired and ignited Lister's imagination. That same compulsion for telling stories of the South and Florida still burn in Lister today.  He has extensively studied creative writing and has two degrees in theology with selective study that focused on myth and narrative.

Career
Lister, in the early 1990s, became the youngest chaplain to serve in the Florida Department of Corrections. For almost a decade, he served chaplain at three different prisons in the Panhandle of Florida: Gulf Forestry Camp, Gulf Correctional Institution, and Calhoun Correctional Institution.  It was Lister's experience in Florida prisons that prepared him to write his first John Jordan novel, Power in the Blood (1997). His other John Jordan novels include Blood of the Lamb (2004), Flesh and Blood (200), The Body and the Blood (2010), Blood Sacrifice (2012), Rivers to Blood (2014) and Innocent Blood (2015). Potter Correctional Institution, considered the toughest maximum security prison in Florida is the setting of the John Jordan novels.
Lister has written historical suspense thrillers. They include The Big Goodbye (2011), The Big Beyond (2013), The Big Hello (2014), and The Big Bout (2015). All are set in Panama City, Florida, in the 1940s during and after World War II. They feature Jimmy "Soldier" Riley, a one-time policeman turned private detective. His James "Soldier" Riley novels include The Big Goodbye (2011), The Big Beyond (2013), In a Spider’s Web (2013), and The Big Hello (2014).
In addition to writing several original plays and screenplays, three of Lister's novels have been adapted for the stage, Double Exposure (2009), The Big Goodbye (2011), and The Big Hello (2014), and one for the screen, Double Exposure (2009).  A screenwriter and filmmaker, Lister worked for three years as the senior staff writer for Triple Horse Entertainment, the largest production company in the South. He was also the editor of the Gulf County Breeze, an old and respected local independent newspaper.
His nonfiction books include the "Meaning" Series: The Meaning Every Moment (2012), The Meaning of Life in Movies (2012), and The Meaning of Jesus (2012).  
Lister's short stories have appeared in such collections as Delta Blues (2011), North Florida Noir (2006) and Florida Heat Wave (2011), which he edited. 
Lister's literary thrillers include Double Exposure (2009), Thunder Beach (2010), Burnt Offerings (2012), Separation Anxiety (2013), and A Certain Retribution (2014).  In the past several years, Lister's mystery novels have been inspired by true crime cases, including the Atlanta murders of 1979–81 (Innocent Blood 2015), the JonBenét Ramsey (Blood Ties 2017), Maura Murray (Cold Blood 2017), Ted Bundy (Blood Work 2017), Madaleine McCann (Blood and Sand 2019), Hae Min Lee (Blood Betrayal 2017 ), and others.

Works
The Song of Suffering (1995)
Why the Worst Sinners Must Be Saints (1996)
Power in the Blood (1997)
Blood of the Lamb (2004)
Flesh and Blood (2006)
North Florida Noir (2006)
Another Quiet Night in Desperation (2008)
Double Exposure (2009)
The Body and the Blood (2010)
Florida Heat Wave (2010)
Thunder Beach (2010)
The Big Goodbye (2011)
Delta Blues (2011)
Finding the Way Again (2011)
Florida Heat Wave (2011)
Blood Sacrifice (2012)
Burnt Offerings (2012)
Carrie’s Gift (2012)
Meaning Every Moment (2012)
The Meaning of Jesus (2012)
The Meaning of Life in Movies (2012)
The Big Beyond (2013)
In a Spider’s Web (2013)
Separation Anxiety (2013)
The Big Hello (2014)
A Certain Retribution (2014)
Rivers to Blood (2014)
Innocent Blood (2015)
Blood Money (2015)
The Big Bout (2015)
Blood Moon (2016)
The Big Blast (2016)
Blood Cries (2016)
Blood Oath (2016)
Blood Work (2016)
Cold Blood(2017)
Blood Betrayal(2017)
Blood Shot (2017)
Blood Ties (2017)
Blood Stone (2018)
Blood Trail (2018)
Bloodshed (2018)
Blue Blood (2018)
And the Sea Became Blood (2019)
The Blood-Dimmed Tild (2019)
Blood and Sand" (2019)A John Jordan Christmas (2019)

 Awards, honors and critical review 
Lister has won two Florida Book Awards: Double Exposure (2009) and Blood Sacrifice'' (2012).

References

External links
 Official Website
 Innocent Blood Book Review
 Tampa Bay Times Book Review
 Phil Jason Review Books Innocent Blood Review
 Publishers Weekly Review

1968 births
Living people
People from Tallahassee, Florida
People from Wewahitchka, Florida